Old Town is an unincorporated community in Dixie County, Florida, United States, located at US 19–ALT 27-98 and State Road 349.  The ZIP Code for Old Town is 32680.

Geography
Old Town is located at  (29.6011, -82.9819), about 40 miles southwest of Gainesville and 12 miles northwest of Chiefland.

Historic places
Historic places in Old Town include:
 City of Hawkinsville, a shipwreck in the Suwannee River, near the Nature Coast Trail State Park
 Old Town Methodist Church built in 1890, located behind the 1983 church building.
 Old Town Elementary School, now the Dixie County Cultural Center

Medical care
For health care, Old Town has a small urgent-care center; but in emergencies, patients are airlifted to Gainesville hospitals. Physical therapy and other rehabilitative services are available in Chiefland.

Education
Residents are served by Dixie District Schools. Old Town Elementary School is located in Old Town. Old Town is also served by secondary schools in Cross City: Ruth Rains Middle School, and Dixie County High School.

References

Unincorporated communities in Dixie County, Florida
Unincorporated communities in Florida